List of kings of Tibet can refer to:
 List of rulers of Tibet
 List of emperors of Tibet